Valkaria Lake is a small man made lake in Brevard County, Florida. This lake has no park areas or public swimming beaches. It is surrounded by a residential area.

References

Lakes of Brevard County, Florida
Lakes of Florida